Manuel "Manu" Rico Del Valle (born 11 January 2003) is a Spanish footballer who plays for SD Huesca as a left winger.

Club career
Rico joined SD Huesca's youth setup at the age of 11 from EF Oscense. He first appeared with the reserves on 5 September 2021, coming on as a second-half substitute in a 1–2 Segunda División RFEF away loss against Terrassa FC.

Rico made his first-team debut 30 November 2021, replacing Dani Escriche late into a 2–0 away win over CD Cayón in the season's Copa del Rey. He made his professional debut on 14 December, as he replaced Kevin Carlos in a 0–1 home loss against Girona FC, also in the national cup.

References

External links

2003 births
Living people
People from Huesca
Sportspeople from the Province of Huesca
Spanish footballers
Footballers from Aragon
Association football wingers
Segunda División players
Segunda Federación players
Tercera Federación players
SD Huesca B players
SD Huesca footballers